Stuart James Reid (born 31 January 1970) is a former  international rugby union player. He plays in the back row.

Rugby Union career

Amateur career

He played for Boroughmuir.

Provincial and professional career

He first played for Edinburgh District on 25 November 1989; against Glasgow District at New Anniesland.

When the Edinburgh District side turned professional he played for Edinburgh.

He played for Cities District on 2 November 1996.

He played for Leeds Tykes.

He moved on to play for Narbonne.

International career

He played for Scotland 'B' 3 times; his first appearance on 22 December 1990 against Ireland 'B'.

He was capped by Scotland 'A'.

He won 8 senior caps for Scotland between 1999 and 2004 .

Notes

1970 births
Living people
Scottish rugby union players
Scotland international rugby union players
Scotland 'B' international rugby union players